Michael Berg (born 1945) is an American activist and politician.

Michael Berg may also refer to:
 Michael Jørn Berg (born 1955), Danish handball player
 Michael Berg (screenwriter), American screenwriter
 Michael Berg, main character in the 1995 Bernhard Schlink novel The Reader and 2008 film adaptation